Show Tunes or Showtune or variation, may refer to:

Show tune, popular song as part of a stage show

Albums
Show Tunes, a 1995 album by Shirley Jones
Show Tunes (album), a 1989 album by Rosemary Clooney
Showtunes (Tommy Keene album), a 2000 album by Tommy Keene
Showtunes (Stephin Merritt and Chen Shi-zheng album), a 2006 album by Chen Shi-zheng and Stephen

Other uses
Showtune (musical), Off Broadway musical revue

See also

 Show (disambiguation)
 Tune (disambiguation)